Oleg Alekseyevich Moliboga (27 February 1953 – 9 June 2022) was a Soviet volleyball player and Russian volleyball coach. Born in Dnipropetrovsk, he participated in the 1976 Summer Olympics and in the 1980 Summer Olympics.

In 1976, he was part of the Soviet team which won the silver medal in the Olympic tournament. He played all five matches. Four years later, in 1980, he won the gold medal with the Soviet team in the 1980 Olympic tournament. He played all six matches.

He was one of the pre-eminent players of the 1970s and the early 1980s, training at the Armed Forces sports society in Dnipropetrovsk. With the USSR national team, he won also two World Championships in 1978 and 1982.

References

External links
 
 
 

1953 births
2022 deaths
Soviet men's volleyball players
Ukrainian men's volleyball players
Olympic volleyball players of the Soviet Union
Volleyball players at the 1976 Summer Olympics
Volleyball players at the 1980 Summer Olympics
Olympic gold medalists for the Soviet Union
Olympic silver medalists for the Soviet Union
Armed Forces sports society athletes
Russian volleyball coaches
Olympic medalists in volleyball
Russian men's volleyball players
Russian people of Ukrainian descent
Coaches of Russia men's national volleyball team
Honoured Coaches of Russia
Medalists at the 1980 Summer Olympics
Medalists at the 1976 Summer Olympics
Sportspeople from Dnipro